A pet recovery service is a service that has been created for the specific purpose of reuniting lost or stolen pets with their owners.

Pet recovery

Without identification tagging
A wide variety of pet recovery services exist, such as online services to search for lost pets. Less traditional services for searching for lost pets include use of a bloodhound, a pet detective, a "psychic", sites that offer advice, such as on how to conduct a search, or sites that offer a bulk-calling computer that can quickly alert hundreds of neighbors by phone.

With identification tagging

External identification
Forms of external identification include collar tags with identifying information numbers or QR codes with the pet information or pet recovery service organization information. The pet could be tracked through a service toll-free number or web address on the tag; The service accesses the pet and owner information in a database via a number or QR code. Some pet identification tags include the owner's address or phone number that can be used to reunite the pet with its owner. There are also registry database services based on tattoo registries.

Electronic tracking devices
Collar-attached electronic tracking devices are used by recovery service providers to reunite the pet with its owner. The contract may also include recovery services, which eliminates any need to rely on the pet encountering a helpful stranger. Although, at least one device does also call for help from anyone nearby. This depends on whether the device is GPS, radio, or Bluetooth.

Microchip implant
Since the early 1990s, the underskin I.D. tag or microchip implant has been promoted as a solution for pet recovery that does not require a collar. Veterinary services, animal shelters, and even some individuals have a chip scanner. In the U.S. such services are unregulated, and several types of chips have emerged with only some adhering to the pertinent ISO standards, ISO 11784 and ISO 11785. Originally each type had its own scanner with no ability to read or even detect other types but there is now a trend to universal scanners able to read all types. In the U.S. more than a dozen pet recovery services maintain databases of chip ID numbers and their associated owners' contact information, and compete with each other not only for the business of the pet owner but also the attention of the pet finder. But unlike the identifying collar tags mentioned above, the appropriate database keeper cannot always be determined from the ID number, complicating the task of returning the pet to its owner.

Metasearch engines
As an aid to the pet finder in this situation, chip registry metasearch engines have been established. Two that have been available at least since 2003 are Europetnet, which has a large number of participating European registries, and Petmaxx, a worldwide registry service. In 2009, the metasearch engine, sponsored by the American Animal Hospital Association, was put online. Most of the major U.S. registries are now participants.

Pets are reunited with their owners by the stray pet's code whose information is accessed via a database. The services are only accessed where chip registry services have decided to interface with metasearch engine services.

Successful metasearch engines connect to all the available registries and can help the pet finder or dog warden find the one registry that has an owner record for a found stray. A potential downfall is that if the pet's information is not registered with all the databases, it is possible for a thief to steal the animal using the 'secure and tamper-proof' ID device, register the stolen pet with another database, and then sell the animal on, transferring apparent clear title in the form of a login account at, or registration document from, the second registry.

The great downfall with the metasearch engines is that most pounds do not have the manpower to search the registry sites for owner information once they access the chip number. The chip number may simply be entered in the paperwork written up by the pound or other agency, never contacting the owner.

Microchip Registration Database 
To ensure lost pets are reunited with their owner its best to have them microchipped and to register it with the chip manufacturer and/or one of the chip agnostic recovery Pet recovery services.  An implantable chip is more secure than a collar tag because the chip cannot be moved between pets or lost as can a collar tag.  A typical pet microchip registration costs $25 to $100 per year and it is incumbent upon the owner to maintain the accuracy of the database in the event of a move or change in contact information.  To remind pet owners to check and update their information, American Animal Hospital Association and the American Veterinary Medical Association have established August 15 as Check a Chip Day.
Registering and keeping the owner's contact information up to date is the most problematic problem facing the pet microchip industry because without up to date information a lost pet is less likely to be returned to its owner.  According to an Ohio State University study, the main reasons owners aren't found for lost pets included incorrect or disconnected phone numbers (35.4%), owner's failure to return phone calls or respond to letters (24.3%), unregistered microchips (9.8%) or microchips registered in a database that differed from the manufacturer (17.2%). At a, mostly yearly, subscription cost to the owner each microchip manufacture maintains their own registration database.  However, these registration databases only hold information related to chips they manufacture requiring a pet finder that does not know who the manufacture is to search multiple sources in order to report a found pet.  There are free registration databases available such as those at Veripet's Rabies Reader page and Found Animals are chip manufacture agnostic.  Veripet Rescue Association's registration is free for the life of the pet.  Veripet also maintains a web page and database of microchip manufacture's recovery phone numbers at their Rabies Reader site (see External Links below) that will provide chip manufacture recovery contact information based solely upon the chip number.  Additionally, if a pet is registered with Veripet, their system sends email and SMS notifications containing the finder's contact information to the pet owner without exposing the pet owner's data to the finder; they do not maintain a recovery hotline.

A recovery database of last resort at the American Animal Hospital Association (AAHA) provides a lookup tool (see External Links below) that will redirect a user to the manufacture's recovery desk but not supply owner information or notifications to them. AAHA works only with those manufactures and recovery services that provide a 24x7x365 hot line where a pet finder can report a found pet.  They do send notifications to their own registered user base in the form of emails for lost pets.

Additional support for animal control and shelters is provided by Veripet's utilization of an Avid 3B Mini-Tracker microchip scanner and its capability to interact with Veripet's mobile app called Rabies Reader available for free on both the Apple App and Google Play stores.  The Rabies Reader app acts as a conduit to connect a scanned microchip to Veripet's microchip registration database.  A successful scan of a chip results in a myriad of information being presented to the animal control officer or shelter volunteer including the chip manufacture's recovery phone number, the status of the pet's rabies vaccination, owner and vet contact as well as allowing immediate notification to the owner that their loved pet has been located.  The information is displayed on the user's mobile device and the scanner's LCD display.

Other related resources
Hotlines: Several veterinary schools around the United States have pet loss support hotlines, as well as various nonprofit agencies.
Online forums for grieving pet owners.
Books: Books on pet loss are published regularly.
Grief counseling: Therapists with training in grief therapy can be located in local communities. In addition, therapists may also include support groups that meet regularly to discuss issues surrounding pet loss.

See also
Microchip implant (animal)
American Humane Association
Rescue group for pets
petkey

References

Animals kept as pets